Cabezabellosa is a village in the province of Cáceres and autonomous community of Extremadura, Spain.

References

	

Municipalities in the Province of Cáceres